Richard Skeel is an American college administrator and baseball coach, currently serving as the senior associate athletic director at Dalton State College in Dalton, Georgia, United States.  Dalton State reestablished its athletic department for NAIA competition, beginning in the 2013–14 academic year.

Skeel previously served as head baseball coach at Cincinnati and Bethune-Cookman.

Coaching career

References

 

Albany Great Danes baseball coaches
Bethune–Cookman Wildcats baseball coaches
Cincinnati Bearcats baseball coaches
Louisville Cardinals baseball coaches
Xavier Musketeers baseball coaches
Living people
Purdue University alumni
Bowling Green State University alumni
Year of birth missing (living people)